ETTV America is a Chinese-language news/business broadcasting channel in the Americas that is operated by ETTV, a Taiwanese subsidiary of parent company Eastern Television. It also broadcasts in English at specific times by Mike Chinoy. 

ETTV America is offered through the Dish Network, AT&T U-verse, and most major cable television providers.

Programs
ETTV Taiwan News
Mike Chinoy in ETTV
Euromaxx
ETTV Global Newshour
ETTV America Headline News
ETTV China News
World Insight
Global Summit
ETTV EZ News
ETTVS Primetime News
Taiwan's Criminal Files

External links
 ETTV America official website

Television networks in the United States